Rafi Tshuva is a former Israeli footballer.

References

1957 births
Living people
Israeli Jews
Israeli footballers
Hapoel Netanya F.C. players
Beitar Tel Aviv F.C. players
Israeli people of Libyan-Jewish descent
Place of birth missing (living people)
Association football forwards
Israel international footballers